Claudiu Dorian Voiculeț (born 8 August 1985 in Târgoviște, Dâmbovița County) is a Romanian former footballer who played as a midfielder.

Club career

CFR Cluj

On 18 June 2013, Voiculeț signed a three-year deal with CFR Cluj.

In summer 2015, signed for ASA Targu Mures.

Honours

Club
Pandurii Târgu Jiu
Liga I (1): runner-up 2012–13

ASA Târgu Mureș
Liga I (1): runner-up 2014–15

External links

Sportspeople from Târgoviște
1985 births
Living people
Romanian footballers
Association football midfielders
FCV Farul Constanța players
FC Internațional Curtea de Argeș players
FC Steaua București players
CS Pandurii Târgu Jiu players
CFR Cluj players
ASA 2013 Târgu Mureș players
Liga I players